Afrodeezia is a studio album by American bass-guitarist Marcus Miller. This is his debut release for Blue Note.

Reception
Jeff Tamarkin in his review for JazzTimes stated, "For Afrodeezia, Marcus Miller—who mentions in his liner notes that he’s a spokesperson for UNESCO’s "Slave Route Project"—chose to incorporate musicians and instrumentation associated with various locales historically impacted by slavery. It’s a formidably funky collection-no surprise there-and some of Miller’s most ambitious work." John Fordham of The Guardian wrote, "Despite the seriousness of his subject, the versatile Miller’s work never altogether shakes off an air of expert slickness, but some strong themes and plenty of urgent improvising more or less neutralise that." Walter Atkins of All About Jazz commented, "Marcus Miller's ambitious continent spanning Afrodeezia follows the Atlantic slave trade routes and celebrates the historical struggles and triumph of the African people and their descendents through the healing power of music. He affirms how vital the music and rhythms are in our lives and the global community."

Track listing

Personnel
Marcus Miller – bass guitar
Ambrose Akinmusire – trumpet
Michael Stewart – trumpet
Keb Mo – guitar
Melvin Watson – guitar
Robert Glasper – keyboards
Cory Henry – organ
Munyungo Jackson – percussion
Marco Lobo – percussion
Lalah Hathaway – vocals
Julia Sarr – backing vocals

References

External links
 

2015 albums
Albums produced by Marcus Miller
Blue Note Records albums
Marcus Miller albums